Sideways is a 2004 comedy drama film.

Sideways may also refer to:

Fiction
 Sideways (2009 film), a Japanese remake of the 2004 film
 Sideways Trilogy, three wine-related novels by Rex Pickett
 Sideways (novel), the 2004 first novel in the trilogy; basis for the films
 Sideways (comics), a DC Comics character
 Sideways, a Transformers: Armada character

Music

Albums
 Sideways (Jacob Young album) or the title song, 2008
 Sideways (Men Without Hats album) or the title song (see below), 1991
 Sideways (Wrabel EP) or the title song, 2014
 Sideways, an EP by Jessica Poland (recording as Charlotte Sometimes), 2010

Songs
 "Sideways" (Clarence Greenwood song), first recorded by Santana, 2002; covered by Citizen Cope (Greenwood), 2004
 "Sideways" (Dierks Bentley song), 2009
 "Sideways" (Illenium song), 2021
 "Sideways" (Men Without Hats song), 1991
 "Sideways", by Frank Ocean from Endless, 2016

See also
 Sidaway, a surname
 Sideway,  an area in Stoke-on-Trent, Staffordshire, England
 Sideway, Kentucky, US
 Sidewise Award for Alternate History, an annual fiction award
 Wayside (disambiguation)